Oussama Mrabet (born 10 July 1993) is a French footballer of Tunisian descent who plays as a midfielder. He appeared in the Bulgarian A PFG for Chernomorets Burgas.

Career
In June 2013, Mrabet joined Chernomorets Burgas in Bulgaria. He made his debut on the opening day of the 2013–14 season, in a 1–0 home win over Cherno More Varna on 20 July, playing the full 90 minutes. Mrabet remained with Chernomorets until late October 2013.

References

External links
 Player Profile at chernomoretz.bg
 

1993 births
Living people
French footballers
French expatriate footballers
French expatriate sportspeople in Bulgaria
Expatriate footballers in Tunisia
Expatriate footballers in Bulgaria
ES Zarzis players
PFC Chernomorets Burgas players
First Professional Football League (Bulgaria) players
Association football midfielders
French sportspeople of Tunisian descent
Tunisian footballers